The Canary Current is a wind-driven surface current that is part of the North Atlantic Gyre. This eastern boundary current branches south from the North Atlantic Current and flows southwest about as far as Senegal where it turns west and later joins the Atlantic North Equatorial Current. The current is named after the Canary Islands. The archipelago partially blocks the flow of the Canary Current (Gyory, 2007).

This wide and slow moving current is thought to have been exploited in the early Phoenician navigation and settlement along the coast of western Morocco. The ancient Phoenicians not only exploited numerous fisheries within this current zone, but also established a factory at Iles Purpuraires off present day Essaouira for extracting a Tyrian purple dye from a marine gastropod murex species.

Upwelling
A prominent feature of Eastern Boundary Currents is the presence of upwelling. Ekman drift causes offshore transport of surface waters, which are then replaced with deep water from below. Deep waters are cold and nutrient-rich and have a key role in stimulating primary productivity. Upwelling has led to the enhancement of coastal fisheries in western Morocco (Hance, 1975). Upwelling, with its consequent chilling on affected seas, also gives near-shore land areas a more temperate microclimate because any air of tropical origin which passes over the chilly water is cooled at its surface level.

Major upwelling occurs between 23 and 25 degrees northern latitude (Canary Current, 2002). Upwelling occurs year-round at Cap Blanc (Ras Nouadhibou) and northward. South of Cap Blanc, upwelling is limited to winter and spring due to the northward migration of the Azores High during summer, which is responsible for driving equatorward winds. Minas et al. (1982) showed that at the latitude of Cap Blanc, a front exists that separates North Atlantic Central Water (NACW) and South Atlantic Central Water (SACW). SACW, to the south of Cap Blanc, is richer in nutrients than NACW. A poleward subsurface counter-current is responsible for bringing SACW to the Cap Blanc region resulting in maximal primary production. Primary production to the north is limited by nutrient availability in NACW. Primary production to the south of Cap Blanc is limited by the occurrence of upwelling events.

Upwelling and primary production
Huntsman and Barber (1977) hypothesized that high productivity results from alternating upwelling events and relatively calm periods. Upwelling is necessary to bring the nutrients to the surface but if the event is sustained for a long period of time, it is tough for phytoplankton to remain in the euphotic zone. Calm periods allow for stratification to develop, which means that phytoplankton can grow and multiply while held in the shallow mixed layer. In other words, there is a miniature spring bloom during each calm period (Mann & Lazier, 1996).

Upwelling and zooplankton
Upwelling and primary production follow the onset of a strong wind within a few days (Mann & Lazier, 1996). Zooplankton, such as copepods, take longer to respond to the abundance of food available because they have life cycles of weeks rather than days. Zooplankton in the Canary Current reach their peak density in autumn when upwelling intensity decreases. The decrease in upwelling allows the zooplankton to stay over the shelf where their food supply exists. Due to the rapid response of phytoplankton to upwelled nutrients, zooplankton are seldom food-limited.

Upwelling and fish
Four types of fish comprise 75% of total catch in the Cap Blanc region (Mann & Lazier, 1996). Clupeids (Sardina pilchardus, the sardine, and Sardinella aurita) were the most abundant. S. pilchards dominate in the cooler northern waters while S. aurita are prevalent in warmer southern waters. Next most abundant were Jack mackerel (Trachurus spp.) and Redfish (Sparidae). Ansa-Emmin (1982) found that in 1974, the total fish landings reached 2.68 million tons. Nearly 1 million tons were Clupeidae with .67 million tons being sardines.

Nutrient recycling
Phytoplankton over the shelf area either sink to the bottom or are consumed by zooplankton. If they settle to the bottom, phytoplankton release ammonia during their decomposition, which returns nitrogen to the waters. Consequently, the phytoplankton remains could be consumed by benthic dwellers, which also excrete ammonia. If consumed by zooplankton, nitrogen from the phytoplankton will be returned to the environment via excreted ammonia or fecal pellets, which settle to the bottom. Regardless of the mechanism, a high proportion of phytoplankton nitrogen ends up being released in the shoreward-moving lower layer of the water column (Mann & Lazier, 1996). This water will later be upwelled and can stimulate further primary production. Barber and Smith (1981) estimated that on the shelf off Cap Blanc, regenerated nitrogen accounted for 72% of total nitrogen.

See also
Portugal Current
Christopher Columbus
Madeira
Elmina Castle
Voyages of Christopher Columbus
Eastern boundary current

References
 Ansa-Emmin, M. (1982) Fisheries in the CINECA region. Rapp. P.-v. Reun. Cons. Int. Explor. Mer. 180: 405-422.
 Barber, R.T. and Smith R.L. (1981) Coastal upwelling ecosystems. pp 31–68. In: A.R. Longhurst (Ed) Analysis of Marine Ecosystems. Academic Press, New York. 741 pp.
 C.Michael Hogan, Mogador: Promontory Fort, The Megalithic Portal, ed. Andy Burnham, November 2, 2007 
 Canary Current (2002)
 Huntsman, S.A. and Barber, R.T. (1977) Primary production off northwest Africa: the relationship to wind and nutrient conditions. Deep-Sea Research. 24: 25-33.
 Joanna Gyory, Arthur J. Mariano, Edward H. Ryan (Retrieved Nov 5, 2007) "The Canary Current" Ocean Surface Currents
 Mann, K. H., and J. R. N. Lazier. Dynamics of Marine Ecosystems: Biological-physical Interactions in the Oceans. Boston: Blackwell Science, 1996. Print.
 Minas, H.J., Codispoti, L.A. and Dugdale, R.C. (1982) Nutrients and primary production in the upwelling region off northwest Africa. Rapp. P.-v. Reún. Cons. Int. Explor. Mer. 180: 148-183.
 William Adams Hance (1975) The Geography of Modern Africa, Columbia University Press,

External links 
 Ocean Currents: Canary Current
 Ocean Gyres
 Encyclopedia of Earth: Canary Current
 Canary Current Large Marine Ecosystem (CCLME) project 

Marine ecoregions
Currents of the Atlantic Ocean